"Winsome" is a song by the Jamaican artist Half Pint. It appears on his debut album from 1984, In Fine Style. The song became a number-one hit.

The Rolling Stones version

The British rock band the Rolling Stones covered the song on their album Dirty Work. The song was renamed "Too Rude" and was sung by guitarist Keith Richards instead of the usual lead singer, Mick Jagger. The co-producer, Steve Lillywhite, used lots of echo tracks, particularly on bass and drums. Jimmy Cliff assists on vocals. "Too Rude" was provisionally a title of the album until Dirty Work was selected. "Too Rude" was covered by Keith Richards' X-pensive Winos when they performed it live in 1988.

References

1984 songs
Jamaican reggae songs